Daniel Raymond McClintock (born April 19, 1977) is a retired American professional basketball player at the center position. He is 7'0" and weighs 260 lb.

He attended Northern Arizona University before being selected with the 53rd overall pick in the 2000 Draft by the National Basketball Association's Denver Nuggets. McClintock's NBA career lasted only 2 weeks as during the 2000–01 NBA season, he only played six games from April 5th to April 18th while averaging 3.0 points and 2.8 rebounds per contest. His final NBA game was on April 18th, 2001 in a 110 - 100 win over the Sacramento Kings. He recorded 2 points and 5 rebounds in his final game.

He later played for MBС Mykolaiv of the Ukrainian Basketball Super League and other teams in Europe.

References

External links
 NBA statistics at basketballreference.com

1977 births
Living people
American expatriate basketball people in China
American expatriate basketball people in France
American expatriate basketball people in Germany
American expatriate basketball people in Italy
American expatriate basketball people in Latvia
American expatriate basketball people in Monaco
American expatriate basketball people in Ukraine
American men's basketball players
AS Monaco Basket players
Basketball players from California
BK Ventspils players
BC Azovmash players
BCM Gravelines players
Centers (basketball)
Denver Nuggets draft picks
Denver Nuggets players
EWE Baskets Oldenburg players
Fortitudo Pallacanestro Bologna players
MBC Mykolaiv players
Northern Arizona Lumberjacks men's basketball players
People from Fountain Valley, California
Shanghai Sharks players
SLUC Nancy Basket players
Sportspeople from Orange County, California